Futbalový štadión Prievidza is a multi-use stadium in Prievidza, Slovakia. It is currently used mostly for football matches and is the home ground of FC Baník Horná Nitra. The stadium holds 7,500 people (2,500 seating).

Reconstruction
In 2016, the reconstruction of the stadium began, worth €1.25 million. Slovak government provided €750,000 of the cost.

International matches
Futbalový štadión Prievidza has hosted one friendly match of the Slovakia national football team.

References

External links
Stadium Database Article

Buildings and structures in Trenčín Region
Football venues in Slovakia
Sport in Trenčín Region
FC Baník Prievidza
Prievidza District